Aage Giødesen (September 1, 1863 – August 4, 1939) was a Danish painter who worked in the late 19th and early 20th centuries. He is mainly known for landscapes, as well as for portraits and marine subjects.

Biography
Giødesen was born in the Danish port town of Korsør. He was the son of Navy Commander Peter Ferdinand Giødesen (1829-1905) and Laura Susanne Georgine Storch (1830-1922). He studied at the Royal Danish Academy of Fine Arts (Det Kongelige Danske Kunstakademi) in Copenhagen, where he was a student of Frederik Vermehren, Carl Heinrich Bloch, and Carl F. Andersen. He was employed as a Professor of Drawing at the Royal Danish Naval Academy (Søværnets Officersskole) from the spring of 1886 until 1907.

Giødesen traveled throughout Europe, including Germany in 1884-86, 1888, 1890; Sweden several times from 1889, the Netherlands, Switzerland, Italy in 1890, Belgium, the Mediterranean, North Africa, Greece, Asia Minor, and the Black Sea in 1893. 
He exhibited widely, notably at the Chicago World's Fair in 1893 and at the official exhibition gallery of the Royal Danish Academy of Art and Charlottenborg Exhibition Hall (Kunsthal Charlottenborg).

References

1863 births
1939 deaths
Artists from Copenhagen
People from Korsør
Royal Danish Academy of Fine Arts alumni
19th-century Danish painters
Danish male painters
20th-century Danish painters
19th-century Danish male artists
20th-century Danish male artists